Campo Alegre and Alto del Cabro are two subbarrios adjacent to each other with similar characteristics in the Barrio of Santurce. They are located between Expreso Baldorioty de Castro to the north, Ponce de León Avenue to the south, Cerra Street to the west and Canals and Robles Streets to the east. These subbarrios, urbanized during the 19th century, are two of the oldest sections of Santurce. The perpendicular streets running north of Ponce de León Avenue are those corresponding to old toponymical alignments of the proprietors throughout Carretera Central.

Architectural value

Today some Masonry structures in the criollo neoclassic style, with two or three-opening façades, some with store (tienda) on street level still exist, although the sector is characterized mainly by its wood vernacular pueblerino criollo constructions.

The most prominent structure of the area, from the architectural-historical point of view, is the Plaza del Mercado de Santurce (Santurce marketplace—also known as La Placita), this West Indian style building is centrally located in the Santurce district and in the center of barrio Campo Alegre and constructed in the first decade of last century.

Plaza del Mercado

The Plaza del Mercado de Santurce has been active for almost a century and as always, the market stocks fresh farmland produce and provisions; tropical fruits, vegetables and yams to herbs & spices and medicinal & aromatic plants, ... a delight for housewives to chefs alike. At noon and in the evenings, quaint restaurants and cantinas with “al fresco” sitting surrounding the Plaza have become popular with the buttoned-up and the bohemian crowds.

Gallery
Sites in Campo Alegre and Alto del Cabro:

See also 
 
 List of communities in Puerto Rico

References

External links

www.frommers.com: Plaza del Mercado de Santurce

Santurce, San Juan, Puerto Rico
Municipality of San Juan

es:Campo Alegre (Santurce)